Colonel George John Smith  (1862–1946) was a New Zealand Member of Parliament for the City of Christchurch electorate in the South Island, and later a member of the Legislative Council.

Early life

Smith was born in Consett in County Durham and educated at the Wesleyan Church School in Newcastle upon Tyne. Following that, he worked at the office of the Government solicitors.

He came to New Zealand in 1879. He was a lawyer and businessman in Christchurch. He was a councillor on the Sydenham Borough Council. A strong prohibitionist, Smith was elected to the Sydenham Licensing Committee in 1891, which was determined to refuse all licences in the borough. Several members including Smith were removed from this position by order of the Supreme Court for "incurable bias".

Member of Parliament

Smith then stood for parliament. In the 1893 election, he came second in the three-member City of Christchurch electorate, and thus entered the House of Representatives. He was re-elected in 1896 (coming second in the electorate), but defeated in 1899. He was returned to parliament again at the 1901 City of Christchurch by-election triggered by the resignation of Charles Lewis. Smith was an Independent MP for his entire parliamentary career.

He was appointed a Commander of the Order of the British Empire (CBE) in the 1918 New Year Honours.

Legislative Council

Smith was appointed to the Legislative Council in 1907, and was a member from 1907 to 1914 and 1920 to 1932.

Other activities

Smith purchased Riverlaw from Hugh Murray-Aynsley in 1905, a substantial property and homestead on the Heathcote River at the bottom of Rapaki Track. He enlarged the house and added a third storey. After his death, Riverlaw was for many years used by the YWCA. On 6 September 1984, the house was registered with the New Zealand Historic Places Trust (since renamed to Heritage New Zealand) as a Category II heritage place, with registration number 3728; Riverlaw was regarded as one of the finest colonial homes in Christchurch. It was significantly damaged in the 2011 Christchurch earthquake and demolished soon after.

Smith was for many years a member of the Board of Governors of Canterbury College (1903–1907, 1913–1917, 1920–1946). He was Chairmen of the Board of Governors from 1928 to 1932.

In 1935, he was awarded the King George V Silver Jubilee Medal.

Notes

References

|-

1862 births
1946 deaths
New Zealand Commanders of the Order of the British Empire
Independent MPs of New Zealand
New Zealand Liberal Party MPs
Members of the New Zealand Legislative Council
Local politicians in New Zealand
New Zealand businesspeople
19th-century New Zealand lawyers
New Zealand temperance activists
English emigrants to New Zealand
Chancellors of the University of Canterbury
Members of the New Zealand House of Representatives
New Zealand MPs for Christchurch electorates
People from Consett
19th-century New Zealand politicians